Nedda is an Italian given name that is a diminutive form of Antonietta and form of Antonia in use in Italy. Notable people with this name include the following:

Given name
Nedda Francy (1908–1982), Argentine actress
Nedda Harrigan (1899–1989), American actress
Nedda Casei (1932–2020), American operatic singer

Fictional character
Nedda, the soprano female lead of the Italian opera, Pagliacci

See also

Neda (disambiguation)
Neddy
Netta (disambiguation)
Nidda (disambiguation)

Notes

Italian feminine given names